Beukelaer is a Flemish surname. It may refer to

 Edouard de Beukelaer, founder of the biscuit company DeBeukelaer
 Joachim Beuckelaer, Flemish Renaissance painter
 Huybrecht Beuckelaer, Flemish Renaissance painter
 Keith Beukelaer, American Idol contestant
 Emile De Beukelaer, Belgian road racing cyclist
 Xavier De Beukelaer, Belgian fencer, also known as Balthasar De Beuckelaer
 Roger De Beukelaer, Belgian cyclist